Riverside Regional Medical Center may refer to:

Riverside County Regional Medical Center, a county-run hospital in Moreno Valley, California
Riverside Regional Medical Center, part of the Riverside Health System in Newport News, Virginia